Diospyros eucalyptifolia is a small tree in the family Ebenaceae. The specific epithet  is from the Latin, referring to the leaves' resemblance to those of the genus Eucalyptus. Habitat is mixed dipterocarp forests from sea level to  altitude. D. eucalyptifolia is endemic to Borneo.

References

eucalyptifolia
Plants described in 1933
Endemic flora of Borneo
Trees of Borneo